Andres Gerber (born 26 April 1973) is a Swiss former footballer and current manager.

He was capped four times for Switzerland as a midfielder and played for Thun.

External links

Andres Gerber, Official UEFA player page

1973 births
Living people
Swiss Super League players
Swiss men's footballers
Switzerland international footballers
FC Thun players
BSC Young Boys players
Grasshopper Club Zürich players
FC Lausanne-Sport players
Swiss football managers
FC Thun managers
Association football defenders